Gitonga may be,

Gitonga language
Charles Gitonga
Charles Gitonga Maina